The 1998 AFC Youth Championship was held from October 17 to October 31, 1998, in Chiang Mai, Thailand. The tournament was won for the ninth time by South Korea in the final against Japan.

Participants

 Thailand (qualified as hosts)
 China
 India
 Iraq
 Japan
 Kazakhstan
 Kuwait
 Qatar
 Saudi Arabia
 South Korea

The teams that reached the semi-finals qualified for the 1999 FIFA World Youth Championship in Nigeria.

Group stage

Group A

Group B

Knockout stage

Semifinal

Third-place match

Final

Winners

Qualification to World Youth Championship
The following teams qualified for the 1999 FIFA World Youth Championship.

External links

 
Youth
1998
1998
1998 in Thai football
1998 in youth association football